S.E. Bayley was a footballer who played for Burslem Port Vale between 1897 and 1901.

Career
Bayley joined Burslem Port Vale in the autumn of 1897, making his debut at the Athletic Ground in a 2–1 defeat by Chesterfield in a Midland League match on 23 October 1897. He played three Football League Second Division games in the 1898–99 season and featured twice in the 1899–1900 campaign. His final match was a 3–1 home win over Middlesbrough on 4 September 1899, where he scored his first and only goal in the Football League but was also seriously injured. He was probably in the summer of 1901.

Career statistics
Source:

References

Year of birth missing
Year of death missing
English footballers
Association football defenders
Port Vale F.C. players
Midland Football League players
English Football League players